A Gulf house, also called a Gulf farmhouse (Gulfhof) or East Frisian house (Ostfriesenhaus), is a type of byre-dwelling that emerged in the 16th and 17th centuries in North Germany. It is timber-framed and built using post-and-beam construction. Initially Gulf houses appeared in the marshes, but later spread to the Frisian geest. They were distributed across the North Sea coastal regions from West Flanders through the Netherlands, East Frisia and Oldenburg as far as Schleswig-Holstein (as a variant called the Haubarg). This spread was interrupted by the Elbe-Weser Triangle which developed a type of Low German house instead, better known as the Low Saxon house.

Historically, the Gulf house belongs to a larger group of aisled barns, which also include medieval tithe barns, monastery granges and Early Modern buildings on farms and manors in France, Britain, the Low Countries, Germany, Scandinavia and the United States. The word Gulf is derived from Scandinavian gulv ('storage floor') and has probably spread in the context of medieval monastic farms.

Emergence 
The Gulf house owes its emergence to economic circumstances. Before its introduction the inthabitants of the Frisian North Sea marshes lived in Old Frisian farmhouses (Altfriesischer Bauernhaus or oud-Friese boerenhuis), a so-called byre-dwelling (Wohnstallhaus). These small buildings had enough space for the farmers because they did not have to store large harvests. Cereal farming was only possible on a few higher-lying areas, whilst the poorly drained marshes were only suitable as grassland and pastureland. As drainage technology improved with the use of windmills and watermills the fertile marshy areas could be dried out and used extensively for grain farming. In order to store the growing quantities of harvest a house with greater capacity was needed, which is how the Gulf house came into being.

Design 
The typical East-Frisian Gulf house consisted of a living space (fööeräen) and an adjoining working area (achteräen) with stable and barn. By extending the roof downwards in the rear part of the house, side bays (Abseiten) were created, the so-called ūtkübben, so that the barn area became wider than the living area. The centre of the stable and barn section formed the Gulf, a storage area for hay, harvest products and tools, which gave this type of house its name.
In one of the side bays were compartments or stalls for keeping cattle (kaustâl). The walkway running in front of them was called the kaugâng ("cow passage"). At the far end there was traditionally the privy (gemak).
At the gable end of the working area were two doors: a large barn door (sğüerdööer) on one side, that gave access for wagons to the threshing floor (dösdêl) and the Gulf, and a small, double door (messeldööer) on the other side. The latter derived its name because it was the door through which cattle dung was carried from the kaugâng (dung = mäers; remove dung = messen).

There was often a semi-circular window in a metal frame over the large barn door which was designed in the form of a stylised rising sun.

The front part of the middle section, at the gable end, in which the horse stable (pêrstâl) was housed, was surrounded by a dividing wall and was given a cover, so that an additional floor (a so-called hiel, plural: hillen) was created on which extra hay for winter feeding was stored.

The weight of the roof was not carried by the outside walls on this type of building, but by an internal group of posts and beams (Ständerwerk or stååpelwârk).

The roof covering of the living area was traditionally made entirely of red clay tiles. By contrast, the lower one-third of the barn roof was covered with tiles, but the upper two-thirds were thatched. The roof was usually in the shape of a half-hipped roof. Where only one end was half-hipped this was the wind-facing gable end (usually the barn gable). The hip is often surmounted, even today, by a decorative staff or Malljan, a device that echoes the mystical beliefs of earlier times.

One feature of many older Gulf farmhouses is the so-called Upkammer (upkååmer), a room in the living quarters, that is higher than the rest of the rooms because it sits above a half-sunken cellar. This can often be recognised from the outside of such buildings by the window arrangement.

The Gulf house structure is found, albeit sometimes with major or situation-specific modifications such as a side entrance, both on large farm buildings (plååts) as well as on smaller buildings including farm labourers' houses.

Other uses 

The restructuring of agriculture and the closure of farms have provided opportunities for Gulf farmhouses to be used for other rural purposes. For example, in Loquard (municipality of Krummhörn, Aurich district) a former Gulf farmhouse has been converted into a primary school. In Hollen (municipality of Uplengen, Leer district) the local Sparkasse bank has moved into a former Gulf farmhouse. The conservation society, NABU, runs an educational establishment for 'near-natural' farming in a Gulf house in Wiegboldsbur (municipality of Südbrookmerland, Aurich).

See also 
 Geestharden house

References

External links 
Gulf house in East Frisia 
Gulf house in the Weser-Ems region 
Types of farmhouses of the Wadden Sea Region 

Vernacular architecture
Architecture in Frisia
Houses in Germany
Farmhouses
Barns
Timber framed buildings